The Pyx, also known as The Hooker Cult Murders and La Lunule, is a 1973 Canadian supernatural horror film based on John Buell's 1959 novel of the same name, and starring Karen Black and Christopher Plummer. Its plot follows a Montreal police detective unraveling the mystery behind the death of a heroin-addicted prostitute who died under bizarre circumstances after falling from a building.

Plot
In Montreal, a motorist witnesses a woman falling or jumping from a tenement building. Police arrive on the scene and find a crucifix and a small metal pyx gripped in her hand. Widowed detective Sergeant Jim Henderson is assigned to the case, and soon determines the woman's identity as Elizabeth Lucy, a heroin-addicted prostitute. Henderson determines that the apartment she leapt from was unoccupied, and that the building also serves as a brothel operation. Leading up to her death, Elizabeth, a lapsed Catholic, was struggling to get her life in order.

Henderson interviews Meg Latimer, the madame of a brothel where Elizabeth was sometimes employed. Meg tells him that Elizabeth frequently worked outside the brothel against Meg's wishes, who felt it was unsafe. Upon returning to re-question Meg at the brothel the following day, Henderson finds both her and one of her employees dead, their throats slashed. He subsequently interviews the building superintendent and shows him Elizabeth's crucifix, but he refuses to speak. Later, Henderson meets with Elizabeth's gay roommate and close friend, Jimmy, who tells him that Elizabeth had acted erratically the day of her death, making oblique references to a new, rich client. Henderson escorts Jimmy back to the apartment he shared with Elizabeth, but the two are ambushed by an unseen assailant who shoots Jimmy to death. A shootout follows between police and the assailant, who hides out on a docked boat.

Henderson concurrently pieces together the narrative of Elizabeth's final weeks leading up to her death: Meg had phoned Elizabeth one afternoon, informing her she had given several "special" clients Elizabeth's contact information. Meg explains that these clients could offer her and Elizabeth a significant amount of money. Elizabeth meets with one of the men, Keerson, a mysterious French-Canadian man who owns the building in which Meg's brothel is located. Elizabeth presumes their first meeting will be a sexual transaction, but instead Keerson merely has her disrobe and tell him her life story.

Elizabeth grows paranoid after she finds herself being followed by Keerson's associates, but Meg dissuades her fears. On the night of her death, Elizabeth arrives at the brothel for the planned "festivities" for which Meg has promised a large payoff. There, Meg drugs Elizabeth's drink. Shortly after, Keerson—in fact a Roman Catholic priest—and other elite occultists arrive to hold a Black Mass. Before the other occultists, Keerson offers Elizabeth a desecrated host from a pyx. Elizabeth takes the host, but moments later throws herself from the window to her death before the occultists can complete the ritual.

Henderson, having obtained Keerson's name from Jimmy before his death, traces Keerson to the his parish, and becomes convinced he is responsible for Elizabeth's death. Upon Henderson's arrival, Keerson admits to performing the black mass, and reveals to Henderson knowledge of intimate details of his life, such as that Henderson was happy upon receiving the news that his wife had died in a car accident. When Keerson implies that he is possessed by Satan himself, Henderson shoots him multiple times. Before Keerson dies, he tells Henderson, "You have set me free."

Cast

Production
Filming began on August 24, 1972, and was completed on October 2, 1972. It was filmed in Montreal, Canada, and includes much French dialogue, alongside the main dialogue in English.

Music
The music was composed by Harry Freedman, with actress Karen Black lending her vocal talents.

Release
The Pyx premiered in Canada on September 17, 1973. It subsequently opened in the United States the following week, in cities such as Detroit and Rochester. It subsequently opened in Montreal on October 5, 1973.

Critical response
Beatrice McKenna of Films in Review wrote: "Director Harvey Hart has worked well with editor Ron Wisman in using flashbacks and cutting, giving pace and excitement and a good deal of suspense to a plot which opens with the death of Karen Black...  Miss Black gives a fine performance, ably assisted by Christopher Plummer, a policeman investigating her death."

Lawrence Van Gelder of The New York Times was less laudatory, writing that "neither devotees of murder mysteries nor devotees of the occult...  are likely to come away satisfied. Point the finger of guilt to a screenplay that tells less than enough about Christopher Plummer...  and so much about Karen Black."

Home media
Scorpion Releasing issued a remastered edition of the film on DVD on October 8, 2011.

References

Sources

External links

1973 horror films
1970s mystery thriller films
1970s supernatural horror films
1973 films
Canadian detective films
Canadian supernatural horror films
Canadian supernatural thriller films
English-language Canadian films
Films about Catholicism
Films about heroin addiction
Films about prostitution
Films about Satanism
Films directed by Harvey Hart
Films set in Montreal
Films shot in Montreal
Police detective films
Religious horror films
1970s Canadian films